Jeffriesburg is an unincorporated community in Franklin County, in the U.S. state of Missouri.

History
A post office called Jeffriesburgh was established in 1857, and remained in operation until 1942. Some say the community was named after Elisha Betts Jeffries, a local politician, while others believe the namesake was Achilles Whitehead Jeffries, a pioneer citizen.

References

Unincorporated communities in Franklin County, Missouri
1857 establishments in Missouri
Unincorporated communities in Missouri